Lisa Lee Dark (born Lee Dark; 16 April 1981) is a Welsh opera singer, songwriter, and voice actress.

Early life
Lisa Lee Dark was born Lee Dark in the Clydach area of Swansea on 16 April 1981. Her distant relatives include Italian opera singer Adelina Patti and American actress Bette Davis. She was born with the rare medical condition congenital adrenal hyperplasia, which leads to excessive generation of testosterone during the early part of foetal life. This meant that she was raised as male because doctors failed to realise that she was biologically female, a fact even she did not discover until she was 19 years old. She was very badly bullied during her school years. She went to an all-boys comprehensive school where she would regularly get kicked, punched, spat at, and have obscene things screamed at her; even outside school, she would get the same treatment because she was slightly different and did not behave like all the other boys.

Acting career
Dark, at the age of ten, first starred in a European advert due to a case of mistaken identity. Her other voice-over acting work has been on low-budget European horror movies; Dark has also done voice-over work, by creating evil chants for a few Hollywood movies and the American television series Buffy the Vampire Slayer. She has to date mostly been uncredited for this work.

Music career

Early work
Dark was first heard singing in her local park by a record producer at the age of six, but due to fear and shyness she did not begin to record until the age of nine. Originally Dark began recording classical, new age and sacred pieces of music for TV and film soundtracks; in 1992, by accident, Dark began to record dance music. Dark, who has an 8–9 octave vocal range, had the ability to mimic other singers. During the 1990s, she would mimic / copy other dance hits, and these were released on the mid-priced budgeted music market, Dark also achieved minor dance hits on the dance music charts by recording remixes of hit songs and releasing them on white labels. This brought Dark her first commercial success, as these recordings sold almost a million copies.

Solo music career
Dark's early live work consisted of her mimicking / copying well known singers like Sarah Brightman, Taylor Dayne, and Kim Wilde.

In 1998, Dark signed her first solo recording contract, valued at £5 million. From 1999 to 2002, Dark released four dance albums: The Unknown Story of Lisa-Lee Dark, 'MM: The Story Continues, Pray (Forever), and Asia. These albums achieved moderate success, shifting 50,000 copies; they were also released as free albums with a DJ compilation remix album. In 2002, Dark was dropped by her record label, VIP international Records, for "not losing weight".

In 2004, Dark released her first mainstream classical album, Breath of Life. This album is Dark's first attempt into the new age, ambient, classical crossover music market. Due to problems with management and the record label, Breath of Life became a huge commercial flop despite positive reviews from critics and the public.

In 2005, Dark decided to train to become an opera singer; due to a lack of money, Dark taught herself to sing opera by mimicking the well known Italian opera divas Renata Scotto and Mirella Freni. In her first opera performances, in 2007, critics said they could not tell Dark apart from Scotto.

Other work
In 1998, Dark recorded vocals for the Cate Blanchett film Elizabeth. She has also recorded vocals on several other Hollywood movie soundtracks. In 2007, she began her semi-professional opera career, performing in small to medium-sized venues around the UK, her debut opera performance was as Liu in Puccini's opera Turandot. Her second opera was the lead in Puccini's Sr. Angelica. In 2008, Dark signed a new £2.5 million recording deal and released her debut opera album, Sola, perduta, abbandonatta, which is only available through specialist sellers and the record company's website. A limited edition second album, The Screen Behind the Mirror, was also released in 2008, free with the debut album, to promote Dark's third opera performance: the lead in Puccini's opera Madama Butterfly. Dark's early opera voice / recordings is her mimicking the Italian opera diva Renata Scotto. In 2009, Dark claimed that she was fired from playing the lead in Puccini's opera Tosca'' for being "too fat" and "not pretty enough".

References

External links
BBC Radio 4 – Hometruths interview
Lisa Lee Dark myspace
Lisa Lee Dark's Twitter page
Lisa Lee Dark's official google profile

1981 births
Living people
Musicians from Swansea
Intersex women
Welsh operatic sopranos
21st-century Welsh women singers
Welsh voice actresses
British people of Irish descent
Opera crossover singers
Intersex actors
Intersex musicians